Return to the Hundred Acre Wood is a Winnie-the-Pooh novel published on 5 October 2009. Written by David Benedictus and illustrated by Mark Burgess, it was the first such book since 1928 and introduced the character Lottie the Otter.

In the mid-1990s, after completing an audio adaptation of Milne's Winnie-the-Pooh stories, Benedictus wrote two Pooh short stories of his own and submitted them to the trustees of the Milne estate.  The trustees replied that they were unable to publish the stories because "Walt Disney owned all the rights."  However, ten years later, Benedictus was contacted by the trustees, who explained that "the sequel rights had reverted to them" and asked Benedictus to make changes to one of the short stories and to submit some more.  This collection of stories was published as Return to the Hundred Acre Wood.

Chapters
In Which Christopher Robin Returns
In Which Owl Does a Crossword and a Spelling Bee Is Held
In Which Rabbit Organizes Almost Everything
In Which It Stops Raining for Ever and Something Slinky Comes Out of the River
In Which Pooh Goes in Search of Honey
In Which Owl Becomes an Author and Then Unbecomes One
In Which Lottie Starts an Academy and Everybody Learns Something
In Which We Are Introduced to the Game of Cricket
In Which Tigger Dreams of Africa
In Which a Harvest Festival Is Held in the Forest and Christopher Robin Springs a Surprise

Lottie the Otter
Lottie is a new character in Return to the Hundred Acre Wood.

Lottie is said to be a "feisty" character who is also said to be good at cricket and insists on proper etiquette. According to Benedictus, "Lottie the Otter truly embodies Winnie-the-Pooh's values of friendship and adventure seen throughout Milne's work, thus making the perfect companion for everyone's favourite bear."

References

External links
After 80 years, Pooh returns to Hundred Acre Woods in sequel
Extract and sample illustration
 Publishers Weekly review 

Winnie-the-Pooh books
Children's short story collections
2009 short story collections
2009 children's books
British children's books
Books about bears
Pigs in literature
Books about tigers

Sequel novels
Egmont Books books